The Aqua Alexandrina was a Roman aqueduct located in the city of Rome. The 22.4 km long aqueduct carried water from Pantano Borghese to the Baths of Alexander on the Campus Martius. It remained in use from the 3rd to the 8th century AD.

History

The aqueduct was constructed in AD 226 as the last of the eleven ancient aqueducts of Rome. It was built under the reign of Emperor Alexander Severus to supply his enlargement of the Baths of Nero, which were renamed Thermae Alexandrinae. The aqueduct was repaired for the first time in the era of Diocletian between the 3rd and 4th century, later between the 5th and 6th century and finally in the 8th century during the reign of Pope Adrian I. The aqueduct was described in the 17th century by Raffaello Fabretti (1680).

Route
The Aqua Alexandrina received its water from the Pantano Borghese swamp near the city of Gabii, now a part of Monte Compatri. The same spring has supplied the Acqua Felice since 1586. The first 6.4 km of the total 22.4 km were tunnelled underground, later run on the surface and 2.4 km was carried on brick arches traversing the valleys of the Roman Campagna. 

Some of its last section inside the city remains uncertain but the aqueduct entered the city at Porta Maggiore and ended on the Campus Martius at the Thermae of Alexander, between the Pantheon and the Piazza Navona.

Technical details
Depending on the season, the aqueduct supplied 120,000 to 320,000 cubic meters of water per day.

The arches of the aqueduct are made of concrete with brick coating. There are four small travertine brackets at the top of each pillar whose function remains unknown.

Remains

The longest continuous above-ground stretch of the aqueduct runs through the district of Centocelle along Via dei Pioppi and Via degli Olmi. Monumental arches are looming above busy Viale Palmiro Togliatti north of Via Casilina. The road runs along the old ditch of Centocelle (Fosso di Centocelle) where the arches reached a height of 20–25 m. Formerly the crossing was an impressive feature of the Roman countryside but now it is totally surrounded by a densely built residential neighbourhood. The brick surface is very well preserved here contrary to the other sections were erosion affected it heavily. 

A second longest visible stretch runs along Via dell'Acquedotto Alessandrino south of Via Casilina. The arches carried the aqueduct through a valley with the lowest point at the crossing of present-day Via Carlo Della Rocca. The ruins are surrounded by houses and a public park called Parco Giordano Sangalli. The arched stretch ends at the crossing with Via di Tor Pignattara.

It is possible to follow the aqueduct from Centocelle towards Pantano Borghese through open fields and scattered farmsteads until the Grande Raccordo Anulare, the great ring road of Rome. There are significantly lower arched stretches at the crossing points of ditches and hollows for example behind the Tor Tre Teste housing estate where a public park was established around the ruins.

Gallery

See also 

List of aqueducts in the city of Rome
List of aqueducts in the Roman Empire
List of Roman aqueducts by date

Ancient Roman technology
Roman engineering

References

External links
 Lacus Curtius article
 Roman Aqueducts
 Andrea Polett

Buildings and structures completed in the 3rd century
Alexandrina
Rome Q. XIX Prenestino-Centocelle
Severus Alexander
Monte Compatri